The 1978 Western Championships, also known as the Cincinnati Open, was a tennis tournament played on outdoor clay courts at the Sunlite Swim and Tennis Club at Old Coney in Cincinnati, Ohio in the United States that was part of the 1978 Colgate-Palmolive Grand Prix. The tournament was held from July 10 through July 16, 1978. First-seeded Eddie Dibbs won the singles title and earned $20,000 first-prize money.

Finals

Singles
 Eddie Dibbs defeated  Raúl Ramírez 5–7, 6–3, 6–2
 It was Dibbs' 2nd singles title of the year and the 15th of his career.

Doubles
 Gene Mayer /  Raúl Ramírez defeated  Ismail El Shafei /  Brian Fairlie 6–3, 6–3

References

External links
 
 ATP tournament profile
 ITF tournament edition details

Cincinnati Open
Cincinnati Masters
1978 in American tennis
Cincin